Zechariah Nahum Obiero (born 18 January 2005) is an English professional footballer who plays as a midfielder for National League South side Cheshunt on loan from EFL League Two side Leyton Orient.

Playing career
Obiero is a youth product of Tottenham Hotspur's youth academy, and joined Leyton Orient's academy at the age of 14. He signed a two and a half year professional contract with Orient in February 2022. He had appeared as an unused substitute in the EFL Cup tie with Queens Park Rangers on 11 August 2021.

He made his senior debut for Orient in the League Two match at Crawley Town on 30 April 2022, which Orient won 2–0.

Personal life
Obiero is the son of the Kenyan former footballer Henry Obiero. His brother, Micah, is also a professional footballer.

Statistics

References

External links

2005 births
Living people
English footballers
English people of Kenyan descent
Association football midfielders
Leyton Orient F.C. players
English Football League players
Black British sportspeople
Cheshunt F.C. players
National League (English football) players